Mian Sara (also Romanized as Mīān Sarā and Mīyānsarā) is a village in Amlash-e Jonubi Rural District, in the Central District of Amlash County, Gilan Province, Iran. At the 2006 census, its population was 47, in 10 families.

References 

Populated places in Amlash County